Raul Gorshumov (born August 13, 1994) is an Israeli footballer.

Gorshumov made his debut for Netanya on October 25, 2014, in a league game against Bnei Sakhnin.

References

External links
 

1994 births
Living people
Israeli footballers
Beitar Nes Tubruk F.C. players
Maccabi Netanya F.C. players
Hapoel Petah Tikva F.C. players
Maccabi Ironi Kiryat Ata F.C. players
F.C. Dimona players
Hakoah Maccabi Amidar Ramat Gan F.C. players
Hapoel Ironi Baqa al-Gharbiyye F.C. players
Hapoel Kfar Shalem F.C. players
F.C. Tira players
Ironi Tiberias F.C. players
Israeli Premier League players
Liga Leumit players
Footballers from Netanya
Association football midfielders